Mimeresia moreelsi is a butterfly in the family Lycaenidae. It lives in forests of Cameroon, the Republic of the Congo, Equatorial Guinea, Gabon, the Democratic Republic of the Congo and Uganda.

Subspecies
 Mimeresia moreelsi moreelsi (Democratic Republic of the Congo: Equateur and Tshuapa)
 Mimeresia moreelsi purpurea (Hawker-Smith, 1933) (Uganda: west to the Bwamba Valley, Democratic Republic of the Congo: Uele, Ituri, Tshopo and possibly Shaba)
 Mimeresia moreelsi tessmanni (Grünberg, 1910) (Cameroon, Congo, Equatorial Guinea, Gabon)

References

Butterflies described in 1901
Poritiinae